Vitex lehmbachii is a species of plant in the family Lamiaceae. It is endemic to Cameroon.  Its natural habitat is subtropical or tropical moist lowland forests. It is threatened by habitat loss.

References

Endemic flora of Cameroon
lehmbachii
Endangered plants
Taxonomy articles created by Polbot